Liver cake is a savoury layer cake found in the cuisines of Ukraine, Russia, and Hungary.  Chicken liver is often used so that the cake will taste light and tender, although beef or pork liver are also viable options.  The liver is mixed in the batter of the cake, rather than served as the filling of the cake.  Cream cheese or mayonnaise is spread between the layers of liver.  Toppings may include carrots, grated eggs, herbs, or onions.

The cake can be served during various family celebrations, including birthdays or holidays such as Maslenitsa, an Eastern Slavic holiday around the end of winter.

Notes

References 

Layer cakes
Hungarian cuisine
Russian cuisine
Ukrainian cuisine